Hydroxylamine oxidoreductase (HAO) is an enzyme found in the prokaryote Nitrosomonas europaea. It plays a critically important role in the biogeochemical nitrogen cycle as part of the metabolism of ammonia-oxidizing bacteria.

The substrate is hydroxylamine (NH2OH), a chemical produced biologically by the enzyme Ammonia monooxygenase. The products of the catalyzed reaction are debated, but recent work shows compelling evidence for the production of nitric oxide.

Structural studies

Crystallographic methods show that HAO is a cross-linked trimer of polypeptides containing 24 heme cofactors.

Reactivity 
For many decades the enzyme was thought to catalyze the following reaction:

NH2OH + H2O -> NO2^- + 5 H+ + 4e^-

Recent work in the field, however, reveals that this enzyme catalyzes an entirely different reaction:

NH2OH -> NO + 3H+ + 3e^-

Subsequent oxidation of the nitric oxide to nitrite caused by reaction with oxygen accounts for the reactivity previous described by Hooper et al.

Environmental Impact 
Nitric oxide, the product of HAO catalysis, is a potent greenhouse gas. Additionally, the oxidized product  of nitric oxide in the presence of oxygen is nitrite - a common pollutant in agricultural run-off.

References

 
 
 

EC 1.7.3
Heme enzymes
Enzymes of known structure